The Kurdistan Region Security Council (Kurdish: Encumena Asayîşa Herêma Kurdistanê, ئەنجومەنی ئاسایشی هەرێمی کوردستان) or KRSC is a high-level national security council in Kurdistan Region.

History 
It was established on 2 May 2011 pursuant to Law 4 of 2011 passed by the Kurdistan Parliament. The body is responsible for inter alia a unified security policy and coordination between security services, military intelligence and existing intelligence agencies.

Chancellor appointment 
The council is part of the region's presidency and is headed by a chancellor appointed by the president of the Kurdistan Region. In July 2012 Masrour Barzani, former head of the Kurdistan Region Security Protection Agency and leading member of the ruling Kurdistan Democratic Party, was appointed as Chancellor by Kurdistan Region President Masoud Barzani.

War on ISIL 
In wake of the Islamic State of Iraq and the Levant offensive against the Kurdistan Region in August 2014, KRSC has been coordinating international coalition airstrikes against ISIL positions. In April and May it announced the arrest of several individuals connected to a car bomb attack near the US Consulate General in Erbil by the Islamic State in Iraq and the Levant.

2015 Hawija operation 
On 22 October 2015, the Directorate of Counter Terrorism (CTD), part and parcel of the Kurdistan Region Security Council, conducted an operation in Hawija backed by US Special Operations Forces. During the operation, they rescued 69 hostages, killed more than 20 ISIL terrorists and captured 6 others. During the course of the operation, a US service member, Master Sgt. Joshua L. Wheeler, was killed. The Kurdistan Region Security Council says its intelligence indicated the hostages, including Peshmerga officers, were to be executed the following morning as mass graves were prepared nearby. It announced there were no Kurds or Peshmerga among the rescued hostages. US Secretary of Defense Ash Carter called the raid 'life-saving' and expected more similar raids with Kurdish partners. Carter added Kurdish forces collected valuable intelligence, including documents and electronics.

Operation Free Sinjar 
The battle for Sinjar, code-named Operation Free Sinjar, was a large offensive supervised by the President of the Kurdistan Region in November 2015. The operation included over 7,500 Peshmerga, backed by international coalition warplanes, against ISIL positions in and around Sinjar.

Before beginning their attack, Peshmerga forces were positioned in three strategic fronts North, East and West of Mount Sinjar to sever Highway 47, a strategic ISIL supply route to move supplies between Iraq and Syria. According to Kurdish authorities, the objectives were also to cordon off the area by creating a buffer zone South of Sinjar and to then enter and clear the city.

Coalition warplanes began pounding ISIL positions at 2100hrs on 11 November ahead of a ground offensive at 0600hrs on 12 November. Having achieved all three strategic objectives, the operation concluded at approximately 1500hrs on 13 November. The Kurdistan Region Security Council announced more than 28 villages were retaken in an area measuring over 200 square kilometers, and 300 ISIL fighters were killed throughout battle.

Media coverage 
The Kurdistan Region Security Council announced that more than 40 local, regional and international media outlets were invited and embedded with Peshmerga units across the fronts in preparation for this offensive.

A hash tag, #FreeSinjar, was preplanned as part of the operation to generate global traction and overshadow the ISIL narrative on social media.

Rescue of Marlin Stivani Nivarlain 
On 17 February 2016, Kurdish authorities announced special forces rescued a Swedish young woman from ISIL captivity. Marlin Stivani Nivarlain, 16 from Borås, was believed to have been misled by an ISIL member to travel to Syria and later to Mosul to join the group.

The Kurdistan Region Security Council said it was called upon by Swedish authorities and members of Nivarlain's family to assist in rescuing her.

Kurdish special forces are part of the Directorate General of Counter-Terrorism, which operates under the Kurdistan Region Security Council.

References 

Government agencies established in 2011
National security councils
Politics of Kurdistan Region (Iraq)